The 2017 Union Budget of India is the
 Annual Financial Statement (AFS) mandated by Article 112 of Constitution of India
 Demands for Grants mandated by Article113 of Constitution of India
 Appropriation Bill mandated by Article 114(3) of Constitution of India 
 Finance Bill mandated by Article110(a) of Constitution of India
 and other documents presented as per the provisions of the Fiscal Responsibility and Budget Management Act, 2003. for the financial year 2017 – 2018.
It was presented before the parliament on 1 February 2017 by the Finance Minister of India, Arun Jaitley with 21.47 lakh crore rupees (US$336.39 billion) budget size.

The Finance Minister of India started speech by quoting "Madam Speaker, On this auspicious day of Vasant Panchami, I rise to present the Budget for 2017-18. Spring is a season of optimism. I extend my warm greetings to everyone on this occasion."

In his speech the Finance Minister of India, Arun Jaitley has quoted that the Agenda for 2017-18 is "Transform, Energise and Clean India" – TEC India. He further went to explain that TEC India means to
 Transform the quality of governance and quality of life of our people
 Energise various sections of society, especially the youth and the vulnerable, and enable them to unleash their true potential
 Clean the country from the evils of corruption, black money and non-transparent political funding.
The printing of the budget documents began with a traditional Halwa ceremony in January 2017.32

It's the first budget after major changes in the economy like Goods and Services Tax (India) and 2016 Indian banknote demonetisation.

Railway budget
Railway budget will be merged with the Union budget and classification of plan and non-plan expenditure has been done away with starting from the year 2017 by Narendra Modi led Government of India.

Key points
 Existing rate of taxation for individual assesses between income of 2.5 lakhs to 5 lakhs reduced to 5%. 
 After rebates, zero tax liability for people with income of 3 lakhs.
 All other categories will also get uniform benefit of Rs 12,500. 
 Surcharge of 10% of tax payable on categories of individuals whose annual taxable income is between 50 lakhs and 1 crore 
 More than 1 crore: 15 percent surcharge
 One page Income tax return to be filed for persons having Taxable income up to 5 lakhs other than income from Profits and Gains from Business or profession(PGBP).
 Maximum limit for audit of specified assesses who opt for presumptive income (Section 44AD of Income Tax Act) scheme increased from 1 crore to 2 crores.
 No transaction above 3 lakhs through cash is permitted subject to certain exceptions
 To promote transparency in electoral funding, maximum donation of 2000 rupees in cash is restricted from one person.
 Foreign Investment Promotion Board (FIPB) will be abolished
 Allocation of Rs 23,000 crore to the Pradhan Mantri Gramin Awas Yojana
 The Finance Minister of India has stated that "Consumer price index inflation is expected to remain within RBI’s mandated range of 2% to 6%".
 The Foreign direct investment increased from 1,07,000 crores in the first half of last year to 1,45,000 crores in the first half of 2016–17.
 As stated by finance minister Foreign-exchange reserves have reached 361 billion US Dollars as on 20 January 2017.
 Rs 48,000 crore allocated towards the Mahatma Gandhi National Rural Employment Guarantee Act (MGNREGA)

Finance Bill 
Finance Minister Arun Jaitley presented Finance Bill on 21 March 2017. He has suggested major overhaul in the bill. 40 changes have been suggested by him in the existing legislations. Some of the major changes are
 The cash transaction limit will be brought down to Rs. 2 lakh from the erstwhile Rs. 3 lakh limit. 
 Aadhaar card should become mandatory for filing IT returns.
 PAN Card would only be issued upon producing the Aadhar card.
 The disclosure of political donations made by companies will be made mandatory.

References

External links 

Union budgets of India
2017 in Indian economy
2017 government budgets
Modi administration